The Madison River is a headwater tributary of the Missouri River, approximately 183 miles (295 km) long, in Wyoming and Montana. Its confluence with the Jefferson and Gallatin rivers near Three Forks, Montana forms the Missouri River.

The Madison rises in Teton County in northwestern Wyoming at the confluence of the Firehole and Gibbon rivers, a location in Yellowstone National Park called Madison Junction. It first flows west, then north through the mountains of southwestern Montana to join the Jefferson and the Gallatin rivers at Three Forks. The Missouri River Headwaters State Park is located on the Madison at Three Forks.
In its upper reaches in Gallatin County, Montana, the Hebgen Dam forms Hebgen Lake. In its middle reaches in Madison County, Montana, the Madison Dam forms Ennis Lake and provides hydroelectric power. In 1959, the 1959 Hebgen Lake earthquake formed Quake Lake just downstream from Hebgen Dam. Downstream from Ennis, the Madison flows through Bear Trap Canyon, known for its class IV-V whitewater. The Bear Trap Canyon section is part of the Lee Metcalf Wilderness area.

The river was named in July 1805 by Meriwether Lewis at Three Forks. The central fork of the three, it was named for U.S. Secretary of State James Madison, who later succeeded Thomas Jefferson as President in 1809. The western fork, the largest, was named for President Jefferson and the east fork for Treasury Secretary Albert Gallatin.

The Madison is a class I river in Montana for the purposes of access for recreational use.

Angling the Madison

The Madison River, from Madison Junction in Yellowstone to Three Forks, is a fly fishing mecca for serious anglers.  It is classified as a blue ribbon fishery in Montana and is one of the most productive streams in Montana for brown trout, rainbow trout and mountain whitefish.

For angling purposes, the Madison can be divided into four distinct sections.

See also

Angling in Yellowstone National Park
 Fishes of Yellowstone National Park
Montana Stream Access Law
List of rivers of Montana
List of Wyoming rivers

References

Sources

External links

 

Rivers of Montana
Rivers of Wyoming
Rivers of Yellowstone National Park
Tributaries of the Missouri River
Rivers of Park County, Wyoming
Rivers of Gallatin County, Montana
Bodies of water of Madison County, Montana